Kinniya Urban Council (KUC) is the local authority for the town of Kinniya in eastern Sri Lanka. KUC is responsible for providing a variety of local public services including roads, sanitation, drains, housing, libraries, public parks and recreational facilities. It has 7 members elected using the open list proportional representation system.

History
Kinniya Urban Council was created with effect from 15 April 2006 from parts of Kinniya Rural Council (Kinniya Pradesha Sabhai or Kinniya Pradeshiya Sabha).

Election results

2006 local government election
Results of the local government election held on 30 March 2006:

The following candidates were elected: Ahamed Lebbe Seyyed Mohamed Buhary (UNP/SLMC); Hajju Mohamed Mohamed Faiz (UPFA); Thangarasa Idayarasa (TNA); Abdulla Mohamed Saalih Mohamed (UNP/SLMC); Mohamed Ameen Mohamed Mujeep (UNP/SLMC); Abdul Careem Abdul Nazar (UPFA); and Iyuoob Thuwan Sabreen (UNP/SLMC).

Abdulla Mohamed Saalih Mohamed (UNP/SLMC) and Mohamed Ameen Mohamed Mujeep (UNP/SLMC) were appointed Chairman and Deputy Chairman respectively.

The term of the council was due to expire in 2010 but on 22 December 2009 Minister of Local Government and Provincial Councils Janaka Bandara Tennakoon extended it until 31 March 2011.

2011 local government election
Results of the local government election held on 17 March 2011:

The following candidates were elected: Seyed Mohamed Buhary Mohamed Haaris; Mohamad Maharoof Hilmi (UPFA); Abdul Kuddus Muhammadu Fajal Kuddus; Mohamed Marsook Riswan Mohamed; Abdul Salam Muhammathu Nazeer; Mohamed Cassim Sabarulla (UPFA); and Iyoob Thuvan Safreen.

Mohamad Maharoof Hilmi (UPFA) and Mohamed Cassim Sabarulla (UPFA) were appointed Chairman and Deputy Chairman respectively.

References

Government of Trincomalee District
Local authorities in Eastern Province, Sri Lanka
Urban councils of Sri Lanka